Rongzhag, also Danba is a county of the eastern Garzê Tibetan Autonomous Prefecture in western Sichuan Province, China. The county seat is the town of Zhanggu.

Climate

References

External links

Populated places in the Garzê Tibetan Autonomous Prefecture
County-level divisions of Sichuan